The 2009 Barcelona Open Banco Sabadell, also known as the Trofeo Torneo de Godó, was a men's tennis tournament played on outdoor clay courts. It was the 57th edition of the event known that year as the Barcelona Open Banco Sabadell, and was part of the ATP World Tour 500 series of the 2009 ATP World Tour. It took place at the Real Club de Tenis Barcelona in Barcelona, Spain, from 20 April through 26 April 2009.

The event also featured a seniors' tournament that was part of the ATP Champions Tour, which was held from 15 to 19 April. Félix Mantilla won the title.

Finals

Singles

 Rafael Nadal defeated  David Ferrer 6–2, 7–5
 It was Nadal's 4th singles title of the year, and his 35th singles title overall. It was his 5th consecutive win at the event.

Doubles

 Daniel Nestor /  Nenad Zimonjić defeated  Mahesh Bhupathi /  Mark Knowles 6–3, 7–6(11–9)

Seniors

 Félix Mantilla defeated  Albert Costa 6–4, 6–1

Entrants

Seeds

 Rankings as of April 20, 2009.

Other entrants
The following players received wildcards into the main draw:

  Juan Carlos Ferrero
  Gastón Gaudio
  Alberto Martín
  Fernando González
  Marat Safin

The following players received entry from the qualifying draw:

  Frederico Gil
  Santiago Ventura
  Daniel Gimeno-Traver
  Pere Riba
  Nicolás Lapentti
  Mikhail Kukushkin
  Fabio Fognini

External links 
 Official website
 ITF tournament edition details

 
2009
Barcelona Open Banco Sabadell
2009 in Catalan sport
Barcelona